Piraterna are a Swedish motorcycle speedway team based in Motala, Sweden The team are two times champions of Sweden. and compete in the Elitserien

History
The club won their first Swedish Speedway Team Championship in 2011 after winning the Elitserien title, beating Indianerna 93-87. Two years later in 2013 the club won a second title.

Season summary

Teams

2023 team

Previous teams

2015 team
 
 
 
 
 
 
 
 
 

2022 team

References 

Swedish speedway teams
Sport in Motala